Akhtiarpur or Akhtiyarpur is a village in Rohtas district in the Indian state of Bihar. Its Census population in 2011 was 1,073.
Akhtiyar pur is known as rajdhani village according to the local people as well as neighborhood people

Nearest railway station is kudra.

Kudra is the local market for this village. In Kudra many numbers of rice mills, CBSE schools, colleges and shops are available.

This village is 5 km far away from NH2 i.e. grand trunk road which connects this village to Varanasi city(i.e. approx 90 km).

Literacy is excellent. It is above 90%.

References

Villages in Rohtas district